A Bunch of Violets is an 1894 play by the British writer Sydney Grundy. It was adapted from the French play Montjoye by Octave Feuillet. It premiered at the Haymarket Theatre and became one of Grundy's greatest successes.

Film adaptation
In 1916 the play was turned into a silent British film A Bunch of Violets directed by Frank Wilson.

References

Bibliography
 Russell Taylor, John. The Rise and Fall of the Well-Made Play. Routledge, 2013.

1894 plays
British plays adapted into films
Plays set in England
Plays by Sydney Grundy